Janet Louise Axelson (born 1949) is an American author and conservationist. She writes and publishes technical literature and documentation under the pen name Jan Axelson. Much of her work relates to computer interfaces and protocols, including USB, Ethernet, serial, and parallel ports. Her books are published by her company Lakeview Research, LLC, which is based in Madison, Wisconsin. She has also written articles for Nuts and Volts, and the Wisconsin State Journal.

Axelson is the president of Friends of Cherokee Marsh, a volunteer conservation organization based in Madison, Wisconsin that protects and restores the Cherokee Marsh wetland area, an ecologically significant part of the Yahara River watershed.

Selected publications

References

External links

Lakeview Research

1949 births
Living people
American technology writers
Women technology writers
American conservationists
Women conservationists